Fez III: The Angry Wizard is an adventure for fantasy role-playing games published by Mayfair Games in 1984.

Contents
Fez III: The Angry Wizard is a scenario for character levels 1–4.  The wizard Fez transforms the heroes into monsters and sends them on a mission into a pyramid full of tricks and traps.

Publication history
Fez III: The Angry Wizard was written by James Robert and Len Bland, with a cover by David B. Mattingly, and was published by Mayfair Games in 1984 as a 32-page book.

Reception

References

Fantasy role-playing game adventures
Role Aids
Role-playing game supplements introduced in 1984